Planet Fitness (PFIP LLC) is an American franchisor and operator of fitness centers based in Hampton, New Hampshire. The company reports that it has around 2,400 clubs, making it one of the largest fitness club franchises by number of members and locations. The franchise has locations in the United States, Canada, Dominican Republic, Panama, Mexico, and Australia. It markets itself as a "Judgement Free Zone" that caters to novice and casual gym users, and has faced both praise and criticism for its atmosphere. It is reported to be the nation’s fastest growing fitness center franchise.

History

In 1992, Planet Fitness founders, Michael and Marc Grondahl acquired a struggling Gold's Gym franchise in Dover, New Hampshire. They eventually closed that original location, opened a gym called Coastal Fitness and brought on a third partner, current CEO Chris Rondeau. In 2002, they purchased the rights to the name Planet Fitness from Rick Berks and renamed their franchise.

Berks had started his own Planet Fitness gym in 1993 in Sunrise, Florida, and eventually expanded it to three clubs, along with a Gold's Gym franchise. Berks had been catering to the bodybuilding culture in his Gold's Gym. "I decided I didn't want to deal with that crowd, so that's when I opened the original Planet Fitness club in Sunrise, Florida, in 1993." The name came from his daughter's school project, "Fitness Planet". The new model was an effort to provide a fitness hub for everyday people. Berks later went on to open the first Youfit Health Club in St. Petersburg, Florida.

Rondeau and the Grondahls recognized that there was a greater opportunity to serve a much larger segment of the population if they changed the gym environment, both in attitude and format, by creating a non-intimidating, low-cost model. Planet Fitness became known as the "Judgement Free Zone", aimed more at the average user than the bodybuilder type of fitness enthusiast. They also dramatically reduced prices to compete against better-known brands. This low-cost business model focuses on the needs of occasional or first-time health club members, rather than more experienced members, and depends on many members rarely showing up. According to a Planet Money episode from 2014, "half of the Planet Fitness members don't ever go to their gyms." In 2003, Planet Fitness opened its first franchised location in Florida, with Eric Dore and Shane McGuiness.

As part of their effort to create a non-intimidating environment, Planet Fitness has alienated many serious weight lifters. The gym utilizes a "lunk alarm", which is a loud siren and rotating light that is used when a gymgoer grunts too loudly or drops weights. Some bodybuilders and weight lifters have found the way they're portrayed in Planet Fitness TV commercials to be offensive, and the way they're treated in Planet Fitness gyms to be "quite possibly discriminatory." Planet Fitness has been criticized for prohibiting certain weightlifting exercises–such as deadlifts and clean-and-jerks–that many experts believe are highly effective. In 2010, Men's Health magazine called Planet Fitness "the worst gym in America."

As early as March 2015, the "Judgement Free Zone" policy was expanded to allow trans women to use the women's locker room. The policy states that "members and guests may use all gym facilities based on their sincere self-reported gender identity."

In the fall of 2013, TSG Consumer Partners LLC became an equity partner in the Planet Fitness franchise. Michael Grondahl, co-founder of Planet Fitness stepped down as CEO, and was succeeded by Chris Rondeau. The company went public on August 6, 2015.

In February 2016, the franchise was added to the Franchise Times "Fast and Serious" list of top franchises (No. 1), and in its 2016 ranking of franchises, Forbes magazine ranked Planet Fitness No. 4. It ranked in the top 50 of Entrepreneur magazine's Franchise 500 in 2017.

In 2020, the company received criticism for charging its customers for March dues "despite closing its facilities nationwide due to the novel coronavirus pandemic." They stated that they were unable to stop the pre-scheduled payments on short notice, but would not charge future monthly dues until they reopen, and would also provide a credit for closed days previously paid for.

While Planet Fitness closed many facilities during the onset of the COVID pandemic, during the Delta and Omicron variants there was not a decrease in gym attendance.

Franchises 

Planet Fitness started franchising units in 2003. According to Franchise Direct, the initial franchise fee is $20,000, while the area development fee is $10,000. The royalty fee for a Planet Fitness is 7% of the total gross monthly and annual membership fees. 

The net worth requirement for a Planet Fitness franchise is $3,000,000, while the liquid cash requirement is $1,500,000.

Statistics and international expansion
The company reports that as of 2019, there are 80 corporate-owned gyms, the rest independently owned and operated.

The club's two membership levels are $10 and $24.99 per month in the United states and in Canada they charge $15 and $25 per month. The $10 per month level includes access to cardio and strength equipment, unlimited group fitness instruction and pizza and bagels once a month; the $24.99 per month ("Black Card") level allows members to bring one guest per day at no charge, access to all Planet Fitness locations, and access to extra amenities, such as tanning booths, massage chairs, red light therapy and water massage beds.

In December 2014, Planet Fitness opened its first international location in Toronto, Ontario, Canada. The second Toronto location opened in early 2015. In October 2015 the company opened their second international location in Santo Domingo, Dominican Republic.

With the addition of a Planet Fitness outlet in Hawaii in January 2018, Planet Fitness had 1,500 locations with an estimated 10 million members across 50 states, the District of Columbia, the Dominican Republic, Mexico, and Panama and Canada. In 2016, over 90% of Planet Fitness locations were opened by existing franchise owners.

Planet Fitness reported that it has around 2,400 gyms worldwide with a total membership of 17 million, generating an annual revenue of $936.8 million at the end of 2022.

Sponsorships
In October 2011, Planet Fitness reached an agreement with NBC to sponsor the network's reality show The Biggest Loser beginning with the 2012 season. The contestants on the show worked out on Planet Fitness equipment  and then at Planet Fitness gyms near their homes, working with Planet Fitness instructors.

In March 2013, Planet Fitness partnered with 50 Cent to sell his energy drink "Street King".

Since December 2014, Planet Fitness has been the official fitness sponsor of Dick Clark's New Year's Rockin' Eve on ABC. 

Since 2015, Planet Fitness has been a personal sponsor of NASCAR driver and champion Joey Logano. In April 2022, Planet Fitness appeared as a sponsor on a race truck for the first time in the 2022 Pinty's Truck Race on Dirt with Logano driving the truck.

In March 2016, Planet Fitness partnered with STOMP Out Bullying, a national organization dedicated to bullying prevention, and the Boys & Girls Clubs of America to launch the company's national philanthropic initiative to address bullying, The Judgement Free Generation. Also in 2016, the company donated more than $1 million to the program. Planet Fitness has also provided mini "Judgement Free Zone" gyms to Boys & Girls Clubs in Manchester, New Hampshire and Pasadena, California.

In October 2017, Planet Fitness and its members raised $1 million which it donated to the non-profit Boys and Girls Clubs of America.

In January 2020, Planet Fitness partnered with The Biggest Loser to be the official sponsor of the show's 2020 reboot.

References

External links

Twitter

Franchises
Health clubs in the United States
Companies based in Rockingham County, New Hampshire
Companies listed on the New York Stock Exchange
Health care companies established in 1992
American companies established in 1992
1992 establishments in New Hampshire
2015 initial public offerings
Medical and health organizations based in New Hampshire
Hampton, New Hampshire